An esker is a ridge of sand and gravel. 

Esker may also refer to:
An eschar, slough or dead tissue
Esker, Iran, a village in Kerman Province, Iran
Esker, County Tyrone, a townland in County Tyrone, Northern Ireland
 Esker, a townland in East Galway
Esker, Wisconsin, an unincorporated community
Esker SA, a French software company